The National Economic and Technological Development Zones are the special areas of the People's Republic of China where foreign direct investment is encouraged.  They are usually called the "Economic and Technological Development Zones" or simply the "Development Zones".

These national level programs started with the Special Economic Zones for three cities in 1978, as part of China's economic reform, and were extended to the Economic and Technological Development Zones in 14 cities in 1984.

List of zones
In 2006, there are now 49 Development Zones:

 Dalian Development Area
 Haining
 Qinhuangdao
 Tianjin Economic-Technological Development Area
 Yantai
 Qingdao
 Nantong
 Lianyungang
 Weihai
 Fuqing Rongqiao
 Tongshan
 Shenyang
 Harbin
 Changchun
 Wuhan
 Wuhu
 Huizhou Dayawan
 Beijing
 Ürümqi
 Hefei
 Zhengzhou
 Xi'an
 Chengdu
 Kunming
 Changsha Economic and Technological Development Zone
 Guiyang
 Nanchang
 Hohhot
 Yinchuan
 Nanjing
 Suzhou Industrial Park
 Shanghai Minhang
 Shanghai Hongqiao
 Shanghai Caohejing Development Zone (Shanghai Metro)
 Shanghai Pudong Lujiazui Financial & Trading Zone
 Shanghai Pudong Waigaiqiao Free-Trade Zone
 Shanghai Pudong Jinqiao Export Manufacturing Zone
 Shanghai Pudong Zhangjiang Hi-Tech Park
 Hangzhou
 Hangzhou Xiangshan
 Ningbo
 Ningbo Daxie Island
 Wenzhou
 Fuzhou Mawei District
 Xiamen Haicang District
 Guangzhou
 Guangzhou Nansha
 Zhanjiang
 Hainan Yangpu Economic Development Zone
 Xining
 Taiyuan
 Lasa
 Nanning
 Lanzhou
 Shuyang Shuyang Economic and Technological Development Zone

Provincial Economic Development Zones
There are now many Provincial Economic Development Zones, such as:

 Dalian Changxing Island Seaport Industrial Area (Liaoning)
 Dongying Economic Development Zone (Shandong)
 Yunmeng County Economic Development Zone, Xiaogan, Hubei
 Hanchuan Economic and Technological Development Zone, Xiaogan, Hubei
 Jingzhou Economic and Technological Development Zone, Jingzhou, Hubei
 Aksu City Economic and Technological Development Zone
Some of them are as large as the National Economic and Technological Development Zones.  There are also the Municipal-Level Economic Development Zones.

See also
 Chinese economic reform
 List of economic and technological development zones in Beijing
 List of economic and technological development zones in Shanghai
 List of technology centers of the world
 Megalopolises in China
 Special economic zone
 Special economic zones of China

References

Further reading
 <https://web.archive.org/web/20161220025544/http://www.ide.go.jp/English/Publish/Periodicals/De/pdf/87_01_05.pdf>
 China Acadmenic Journals Full-text Database <http://www.eastview.com/>
 <http://www.ntpu.edu.tw/econ/files/Journal/20110308170007.pdf>

External links
Ministry of Commerce (MOFCOM)
China Association of Development Zones
China Development Zones
Support service to enter development Zones to Mainland China
China Industrial Zone and Property Directory at RightSite.asia

Economic development in China
Industry in China